XEQIN-AM/XHSQB-FM (La Voz del Valle – "The Voice of the Valley") is an indigenous community radio station that broadcasts in Spanish, Mixtec, Zapotec and Triqui from San Quintín in the Mexican state of Baja California.

It is run by the Cultural Indigenist Broadcasting System (SRCI) of the National Commission for the Development of Indigenous Peoples (CDI).

History
XEQIN began broadcasting on 15 June 1994 on 1290 kHz with a power of 2,500 watts. In the first quarter of 2006, its transmission facility was upgraded to 10,000 watts and it relocated to 1160 kHz. It transmits daily from 05:00 to 19:00 hours, with a potential audience of 260,000 people. The indigenous-language speakers it targets are mostly migrant workers from the southern states of Oaxaca, Guerrero and Puebla. XEQIN-AM is a daytime-only station because it broadcasts on the United States clear-channel frequency of 1160 kHz, on which KSL is the dominant station.

In 2016, the CDI obtained an FM frequency to simulcast XEQIN, XHSQB-FM 95.1, which began test transmissions in January 2018.

External links
XEQIN website
FCC information on XEQIN

References

Indigenous peoples of Oaxaca
Mixtec-language radio stations
Trique-language radio stations
Zapotec-language radio stations
Radio stations in Baja California
Sistema de Radiodifusoras Culturales Indígenas
1994 establishments in Mexico
Radio stations established in 1994
Daytime-only radio stations in Mexico